Wallis Mathias (4 February 1935 – 1 September 1994) was a Pakistani cricketer who played in 21 Tests from 1955 to 1962. A Catholic, he was the first non-Muslim cricketer to play for Pakistan. He belonged to Karachi's Goan community.

The son of a porter at the Karachi Gymkhana Club, Mathias was a stylish right-handed middle-order batsman. He made three half centuries in his Test career, all of them against West Indies. In the Second Test against West Indies in Dacca in 1958-59, he top-scored in each innings with 64 and 45, as Pakistan won a low-scoring match by 41 runs.

He was also a gifted slip fielder with exceptional reflexes, whose "great skill was to make hard chances look simple". According to Imtiaz Ahmed, the Test wicket-keeper at the time, he was Pakistan's first good slip fielder, who "changed the atmosphere in the slip cordon", which previously had been the domain of players "who did not want to run".

He was a prolific run scorer in Pakistani domestic cricket. After he returned from the tour of England in 1962, in the next four years he made 1357 runs in 13 matches at an average of 113.08, including his career-best score of 278 not out for Karachi Blues against Railways Greens in 1965-66. Four years later he joined the newly formed National Bank cricket team and became their first ever captain, playing for them until 1976-77 and later coaching the side.  In 146 first-class matches he made 7,520 runs, average 44.49, including 16 centuries. He held 130 catches, 22 in Tests. 

Mathias died of a brain haemorrhage in 1994, aged 59.

Education
He was educated at the St. Patrick's High School, Karachi.

References

External links
Wallis Mathias Cricinfo profile
Wallis Mathias at CricketArchive

1935 births
1994 deaths
Pakistan Test cricketers
Sindh cricketers
National Bank of Pakistan cricketers
Pakistani Roman Catholics
Pakistani cricketers
Karachi cricketers
Karachi A cricketers
Karachi Blues cricketers
Karachi Whites cricketers
South Zone (Pakistan) cricketers
Pakistani people of Goan descent
St. Patrick's High School, Karachi alumni